Jesse Carter Gilbert (1831, Benton, Kentucky - 24 September 1894, Longview, Texas)  was an attorney and politician. He served in the Kentucky House of Representatives starting in 1861. He was elected state senator from the second district in 1871 and served until 1875. Afterward he was an attorney, practicing in Paducah, Kentucky for the balance of his life. The town of Gilbertsville, Kentucky was named for him in 1874.

References

1831 births
1894 deaths
Kentucky state senators
Members of the Kentucky House of Representatives
People from Benton, Kentucky
People from McCracken County, Kentucky
19th-century American politicians